Aref Al Agha (born 17 November 1976) is a Syrian former professional footballer who played for the Syria national team.

Career
Al Agha won the top scorer of the Syrian Premier League for three times with Hutteen and once with Taliya.

External links

Living people
1976 births
Syrian footballers
Association football forwards
Syria international footballers
Place of birth missing (living people)
Hutteen Latakia players
Taliya SC players
Al-Wahda SC (Syria) players
Syrian Premier League players